Road to Fast 9 is a commercial mixtape released on July 31, 2020. The mixtape featured 13 tracks performed by various rap and hip-hop artists to promote the 2021 action film F9, the ninth instalment in the Fast & Furious franchise. The featuring artists including YoungBoy Never Broke Again, Lil Baby, Kevin Gates and Tory Lanez, Don Toliver, Lil Skies, Wiz Khalifa, Toosii, Tyga, Mozzy, NLE Choppa, Arcángel amongst others.

Singles 
On June 19, 2020, the track "One Shot" performed by YoungBoy Never Broke Again and Lil Baby was released as the first track from the album. Later, the second single "Convertible Burt" by Kevin Gates and Tory Lanez was released on July 3. The third single "Red & Yellow" performed by Lil Skies was released on July 9, and the fourth single "How 2 Ride" performed by KingmostWanted was released July 16. The fifth and sixth singles, "No Hay Amor" and "Ruff Rydas" were released on July 23. The tracks were performed by Arcángel and NLE Choppa. The seventh track, "Clap" performed by Don Toliver was released on July 30, and the eighth track "Too Fast" was released on July 31, coinciding with the mixtape release.

Track listing

See also 

 Fast & Furious

References 

2020 mixtape albums
Fast & Furious albums
Atlantic Records albums
Albums produced by Frank Dukes
Albums produced by WondaGurl
Promotional albums